Pterotrigonia is an extinct genus of saltwater clams, marine bivalve molluscs in the family Megatrigoniidae. This genus is known in the fossil record from the Jurassic period Tithonian age to the Cretaceous period Maastrichtian age. Species in this genus were facultatively mobile infaunal suspension feeders. The type species of the genus is Pterotrigonia cristata.

Pterotrigonia thoracica, was selected as the state fossil of Tennessee in 1998. 

Scabrotrigonia is a subgenus of Pterotrigonia.

Distribution
Fossils of species within this genus have been found in the Jurassic of Antarctica, Chile and India, as well as in the Cretaceous of Angola, Antarctica, Argentina, Austria, Chile, Colombia, Cuba, Ecuador, Egypt, France, Hungary, Italy, Japan, Libya, Madagascar, Mexico, Mozambique, New Zealand, Oman, Peru, Portugal, Serbia and Montenegro, South Africa, Spain, Trinidad and Tobago, Russia, Ukraine, United Arab Emirates, United Kingdom, United States and Yemen.

References

Paleobiology Database
Sepkoski, Jack Sepkoski's Online Genus Database
Zipcodezoo

Prehistoric bivalve genera
Trigoniida
Prehistoric bivalves of North America
Cretaceous bivalves
Fossils of Serbia